Bahadurpur Assembly constituency is an assembly constituency in Darbhanga district in the Indian state of Bihar.

Overview
As per Delimitation of Parliamentary and Assembly constituencies Order, 2008, No. 85 Bahadurpur Assembly constituency is composed of the following: Bahadurpur and Hanuman Nagar community development blocks.

Bahadurpur Assembly constituency is part of No. 14 Darbhanga (Lok Sabha constituency).

Members of Legislative Assembly

Election Results

2020

2015

References

External links
 

Assembly constituencies of Bihar
Politics of Darbhanga district